Leslie Morgenstein is the President and Founder of Alloy Entertainment, a creator and producer of books, television, and film. The Los Angeles and New York-based production company officially became part of Warner Bros. Television Group in 2012. Morgenstein previously served as President of the company's predecessor, 17th Street Productions, Inc. starting in 1999. He has been credited with facilitating the adaptation of a number of book titles into television series. Examples include Gossip Girl, The Vampire Diaries, Pretty Little Liars, and The 100.  Morgenstein has also been involved in feature film projects, credited as an executive producer on the Sisterhood of the Traveling Pants series and as a producer on Netflix's Purple Hearts.

Early Life and Education 
Morgenstein graduated from Sarah Lawrence College with a degree in Writing and Photography. He also has an MBA in Finance from New York University Stern School of Business and completed his master's work in English and Creative Writing at City College of New York.

Career 
Morgenstein produces or executive produces Alloy Entertainment's television series and feature films. He has produced more than twenty series, including current series You, Gossip Girl, and Pretty Little Liars: Original Sin.

In features, Morgenstein's credits include The Sisterhood of the Traveling Pants I & II, Work It, Everything, Everything, Good Girls Get High, and The Sun Is Also a Star. Morgenstein most recently produced the Netflix film Purple Hearts, based on the Alloy Entertainment novel of the same name. Purple Hearts stars Sofia Carson and Nicholas Galitzine, and is the 8th most popular film on Netflix of all time. It was the first film of 2022 on the platform to break 100 million hours viewed in a single week.

Via Alloy's publishing division, Morgenstein oversees the creation and production of approximately twenty titles a year. The company has had more than eighty New York Times Best Sellers including Everything, Everything, American Royals, The Sisterhood of the Traveling Pants, and Frankly in Love.

Filmography

Film

Television

References

External links



Film producers from New York (state)
Television producers from New York City
City College of New York alumni
Living people
Businesspeople from New York City
Sarah Lawrence College alumni
New York University Stern School of Business alumni
Year of birth missing (living people)